Iver Johan Unsgård (26 June 1903 – 30 June 1993) was a Norwegian politician for the Labour Party.

He was elected to the Norwegian Parliament from Sør-Trøndelag in 1958, and was re-elected on two occasions. He had previously been a deputy representative from 1954 to 1957.

Unsgård was born in Tydal and mayor of Tydal municipality during the terms 1945–1951, 1951–1955 and 1955–1958.

References

1903 births
1993 deaths
Labour Party (Norway) politicians
Members of the Storting
20th-century Norwegian politicians